Jamell is a given name. Notable people with the name include:

 Jamell Anderson (born 1990), British basketball player
 Jamell Fleming (born 1989), American football cornerback
 Jamell Orlando Ramos (born 1981), Colombian football right back

See also
Jamelle (disambiguation)